Parliamentary elections were held in Finland on 7 and 8 March 1954.

Background
In June 1953, Prime Minister Urho Kekkonen had presented a simultaneous deflationary program, which tried to lower wages, prices and public expenditures to the level of the export industry's profitability.  Among other proposals, the deflationary program aimed to remove the Finnish parents' family allowances for their first children, reduce income, sales and corporate taxes, cut the interest rate, and reduce wages by 10%.  Finance Minister Juho Niukkanen (Agrarian League) presented an austerity budget to Parliament in September 1953, which proposed cutting all major government expenditures by 15%. The Social Democratic Party and People's Party of Finland opposed the austerity budget. Since Parliament refused to approve the government's planned changes to the state-subsidized apartment buildings' and other residences' construction, Kekkonen resigned in November 1953. Despite President Juho Kusti Paasikivi's urgings (in his opinion, Kekkonen was a valuable Prime Minister because he managed Finnish-Soviet relations skilfully), the Social Democrats refused to allow Kekkonen to continue as Prime Minister.

Sakari Tuomioja, a member of the Liberal League who had earlier served in the government, for example as Foreign Minister, and had been Governor of the Bank of Finland since 1945, formed a centre-right caretaker government. Tuomioja's government wanted to keep rationing wages, but wanted to dismantle other types of rationing. Coffee was released from rationing in March 1954.  Finnish exports grew, and the government's expenditures increased by over 20% compared to Kekkonen's fourth government's proposal. Various right-wingers and Social Democrats preferred early elections to boost their number of deputies, and to prevent Kekkonen from becoming Prime Minister again. Given President Paasikivi's advanced age (83 years) and close relations with Kekkonen, the latter could well succeed Paasikivi as President, should Paasikivi suddenly die or resign.

The Social Democrats went to the election campaign trail with the lofty slogan:  "Kekkonen Kampinkadulle" ( Kekkonen Back to Camp Street (Kampinkatu), his home of 25 years before his premiership & which was subsequently renamed after him).  To their surprise and to that of right-wingers, the Agrarians gained two seats, while the Social Democrats, National Coalition Party and Swedish People's Party suffered a net loss of four seats. Ralf Törngren of the Swedish People's Party formed a centre-left government in May 1954, with Kekkonen as Foreign Minister. The Central Organisation of Finnish Trade Unions favoured the lowering of living costs, through subsidies, to the start level of the economic stabilization period.  The Social Democrats and Agrarians agreed and, dissatisfied with Prime Minister Törngren's economic compromises, caused Törngren to resign and Kekkonen to become Prime Minister for the fifth time in October 1954.

Results

References

General elections in Finland
Finland
Parliament
Finland
Election and referendum articles with incomplete results